Weekend at Burnie's is the fifth studio album by American rapper Curren$y. The album was released on June 28, 2011, through Warner Bros. Eleven tracks on this album are produced by Monsta Beatz. The album's lead single, "#JetsGo" is produced by Rahki. "You See It" and "This Is the Life" were leaked to promote the album. On June 21 Curren$y premiered the album during a Ustream-Session. It featured the Bonus Tracks "JLC" and "Get Paid." In its first week, the album sold 23,000 copies in the US, after a Billboard 200 debut of #22.

Critical reception
Weekend at Burnie's was met with "generally favorable" reviews from critics. At Metacritic, which assigns a weighted average rating out of 100 to reviews from mainstream publications, this release received an average score of 77 based on 12 reviews. Aggregate website AnyDecentMusic? gave the release a 7.2 out of 10 based on a critical consensus of 5 reviews.

In a review for AllMusic, critic reviewer David Jeffries said: Currensy’s Weekend at Burnie's EP and/or mixtape is a worthwhile distraction, offering fans of his Pilot Talk efforts a chance to hear the rapper in a different setting. Here, the setting is hard, minimal, and retro, with producer Monsta Beatz bringing the ‘80s flavor on all tracks." Andres Tardio of HipHopDX gave the release a 3 out of 5, explaining: "There's an inconsistency on Weekend at Burnie's that keeps it from being fully successful. At some points, Curren$y shows why he was given the Spitta moniker, but other times, he shows how limited his flow and subject matter can be, slowly pushing through tracks with no real focus." At Pitchfork, Tom Breihan wrote: "Weekend at Burnie's is remarkably warm and approachable, and it brings Curren$y closer to the sound of current radio-rap than he's been in a while."

Accolades

Track listing

Charts

Weekly charts

Year-end charts

References

2011 albums
Currensy albums
Warner Records albums